{{DISPLAYTITLE:C21H34O4}}
The molecular formula C21H34O4 (molar mass: 350.49 g/mol, exact mass: 350.2457 u) may refer to:

 Tetrahydrocorticosterone, or 3α,5α-Tetrahydrocorticosterone
 U46619

Molecular formulas